Odise Roshi (born 22 May 1991) is an Albanian professional footballer who plays as a right winger for Turkish club Sakaryaspor and the Albania national team.

Roshi started his professional career with his hometown club Apolonia Fier whom he played three years. In 2009, he joined Flamurtari Vlorë where he would become one of the most important players. The 2010–11 season turned out to be his breakthrough season, which earned him a transfer to 1. FC Köln of Bundesliga. Roshi failed to make an impact there, and after one season he left to sign with FSV Frankfurt in the 2. Bundesliga. During his spell at Bornheimer, Roshi made more than 70 league appearances, and in 2015 was sold at HNK Rijeka in Croatia. He left the club after only one season due to limited playing time and signed with Akhmat Grozny of Russian Premier League.

Roshi has represented Albania at under-17 and -21 levels before making his senior debut in 2011. Since then he has more than 40 caps to his name, and was part of UEFA Euro 2016 squad.

Club career

Early career
Roshi was born in Fier, Albania. Growing up in Fier, Roshi started his youth career at age of 10 and eventually joined city based club Apolonia Fier in 2008. During his youth career, he had try outs with the youth team of Paris Saint-Germain but failed to secure a contract with them. Roshi made his way through the ranks of Apolonia and broke into the senior team at the age of sixteen.

Apolonia Fier
Roshi made five appearances for Apolonia in the 2006–07 season. He showed promise despite Apolonia being relegated to the Albanian First Division. Getting regular time in the first division, Roshi was crucial in helping his club gain a spot in the top two positions of the table, hence promoting the team to the Albanian Superliga.

Roshi's season in the Superliga showcased his talent, earning him call-ups to the youth levels of the national team. He helped Apolonia maintain a mid-table position.

Flamurtari Vlorë
In July 2009, Roshi joined fellow Albanian Superliga side Flamurtari Vlorë. He made his competitive debut during the qualification rounds of the Europa League where Flamurtari came up against Scottish side Motherwell. Roshi played well in both legs and scored a goal in the away leg despite Flamurtari being eliminated. His league debut occurred on 23 August in the opening matchday against Tirana which ended in a 3–1 away win, with Roshi scoring his team's second goal. In his first season, Roshi contributed with 29 league matches and 3 goals, collecting 2067 minutes on the field, as Flamurtari finished 5th in championship, failing to clinch a spot for European competitions.

1. FC Köln
At the end of the 2010–11 season, there was speculation surrounding Roshi that Belgian club Anderlecht, as well as German club 1. FC Köln, were interested in signing the Albanian. On 19 May 2011, Roshi completed a transfer to Köln as a free agent by penning a four-year contract. Köln director Volker Finke stated that Roshi was a "highly talented" player with a promising future as an attacking midfielder.

Roshi made his Bundesliga debut for Köln on 6 August 2011 against VfL Wolfsburg coming on as a substitute in the 83rd minute for Kevin Pezzoni with choice of coach Stale Solbakken to raise attack force. Roshi scored his first goal for Köln on 5 February 2012 only 99 seconds after coming on the pitch in the 72nd minute and his goal resulted to be decisive as Köln took 1–0 victory over 1. FC Kaiserslautern. Also with this victory, Köln ended its three-game losing streak and it was Köln's first victory over Kaiserslautern in over 22 years. Roshi assisted the Milivoje Novaković's goal against 1. FC Nürnberg two weeks later in 2–1 loss. Roshi managed to play 3 games as a starter and concluded the season with 20 overall appearances, scoring 1 goal and 1 assist.

FSV Frankfurt
On 6 August 2012, it was announced that the 21-year-old winger would be joining FSV Frankfurt on a one-year loan. Fellow Albanian Edmond Kapllani had joined the club a month earlier. Uwe Stöver, the sports director of FSV Frankfurt, stated that Roshi had demonstrated his qualities in the previous season in the Bundesliga for Köln and he was convinced that Roshi's addition would boost the offensive play of Frankfurt.

Roshi assisted a goal against Erzgebirge Aue in the third game of the 2012–13 season. On 21 September 2012, Roshi scored his first goal for Frankfurt against FC St. Pauli. He scored from outside the far corner of the box. On 27 April 2013, he scored Frankfurt's second goal against Dynamo Dresden in the 84th minute, 10 minutes after coming on as a substitute in a 3–1 victory.

On 4 April 2014, in the absence of his compatriot teammate Kapllani due to an injury, Roshi played up front and scored in the 61st minute in a 2–1 loss against VfR Aalen. As a result of that goal, Roshi was included in the 2. Bundesliga team of the week.

After suffering from some muscular problems, on 8 February 2015, Roshi returned and scored in the match against 1. FC Nürnberg. He started up front alongside Mohamed Amine Aoudia and scored the opening goal in a 2–1 victory. Roshi scored again in the next fixture against Red Bull Leipzig on 15 February 2015 to earn his side a 1–0 away victory.

HNK Rijeka
After Roshi refused to extend his contract with FSV Frankfurt, on 6 June 2015 he joined as a free agent at Croatian First League side HNK Rijeka by penning a three-year contract. Roshi returned from injury for the league game against Slaven Belupo Koprivnica on 19 July 2015 and started from the bench. He was an unused substitute for the match. Roshi made his debut for Rijeka in the Europa League away fixture against Aberdeen on 23 July 2015. He scored his first goal for the club in their 4–1 home win against Zagreb on 4 October 2015.

Terek and Akhmat Grozny
On 21 July 2016, press reports confirmed that Roshi signed for FC Terek Grozny in the Russian Premier League.

On 2 April 2017, Roshi provided an assist against Amkar Perm for the Magomed Mitrishev's goal in the 31st minute which brought balance 1–1 and helped Terek to take a draw as the score didn't change until the end.

On 18 August 2018, he suffered an ACL injury that was expected to keep him out of play for six months.

On 23 June 2021, his contract with Akhmat was terminated by mutual consent.

Loan to Diósgyőri VTK
On 15 February 2021, he was loaned to Hungarian club Diósgyőri VTK until the end of the 2020–21 season.

Boluspor
On 9 August 2021, he signed a one-year contract with one-year extension option with Boluspor in Turkey.

International career

Albania U17
Roshi was capped three times for the Albania under-17 team in the 2008 UEFA European Under-17 Championship qualifying campaign under coach Shpëtim Duro, making his debut on 27 October 2007 in the 3–0 loss against Netherlands. Albania U17s were eliminated from the qualifying round, collecting only 1 draw and 2 losses with 1 goal scored and 10 conceded.

Albania U21

Roshi was called up for the first time to the Albania under-21 team by the coach Artan Bushati for the 2011 UEFA European Under-21 Championship qualification match against Azerbaijan U21s on 5 September 2009. He made his debut against Azerbaijan U21s coming on as a substitute at half-time in place of Hair Zeqiri. Albania U21s won the match 1–0 with an own goal scored by Eshgin Guliyev in the 63rd minute. Following his good second-half performance, in the next match four days later against Austria U21s, Roshi started the match and scored his first under-21 goal in the 41st minute. Austria U21s won that match 3–1 after scoring all 3 of their goals in the first 13 minutes of the match. Roshi played in four of the next six qualifying matches and scored 2 more goals. Albania U21s finished in fourth place out of five teams, managing 1 win, 1 draw and 6 losses with 11 goals scored and 20 conceded.

Roshi was called up again and under the same coach Artan Bushati he played in the two opening 2013 UEFA European Under-21 Championship qualification matches against Poland U21s in a 3–0 loss on 2 September 2011 and in a 4–3 victory against Moldova U21s on 6 September, both for the full 90 minutes.

Senior team
After being given his first senior international call-up by Josip Kuže on 30 September 2011, Roshi made his debut with the Albanian senior team on 7 October, playing ful-90 minutes in the penultimate UEFA Euro 2012 qualifying match against France which ended in a 3–0 loss.

Roshi then continued to be part of senior team, appearing in numerous friendlies before being included in September 2012 for the opening 2014 FIFA World Cup qualification matches against Cyprus and Switzerland. He played only in the second match against Switzerland which finished in a 2–0 away loss with Roshi appearing as substitute. Roshi scored his first international goal later on 16 October in the match against Slovenia, heading home an Emiljano Vila cross to give his team a 1–0 home win. Roshi then finished his World Cup qualifying campaign by playing 8 matches, 5 of them as starter, collecting 564 minutes as Albania finished 5th in Group E.

Roshi spent the UEFA Euro 2016 qualifying campaign between bench and field, making only five appearances in the team's successful qualifying campaign. In the opening match away against Portugal on 7 September 2014, Roshi provided the match's only goal with a cross which found Bekim Balaj. It was also the first ever win against "Seleção das Quinas". He missed out the matches in October 2014 due to a hamstring injury. He played full-90 minutes in final match away against Armenia, building up the third Albania goal scored by Sadiku as Albania won 3–0 which confirmed their place in UEFA Euro 2016, its first ever appearance at a major men's football tournament.

On 21 May 2016, Roshi was named in Albania's preliminary 27-man squad for UEFA Euro 2016, and in Albania's final 23-man UEFA Euro 2016 squad on 31 May.

He played as a starter in the opening Group A match against Switzerland which was lost 1–0. Then he went on to play in the remaining two matches as substitute as Albania finished 3rd in Group A with three points and with a goal difference –2, and was ranked last in the third-placed teams, which eventually eliminated them.

Roshi scored his second international goal after five years in the 2–1 friendly loss to Luxembourg in June 2017. He captained Albania for the first time in his 48th appearance later on 26 March 2018, playing the first half of a 1–0 home loss to Norway.

Nickname
Roshi earned the nickname Raketa (Rocket) due to his fast pace on the football pitch. In his physical test at Köln, Roshi ran 30 metres in 3.7 seconds and 100 metres in 10.9 seconds, achieving the highest score in his team.

Career statistics

Club

International

International goals
As of match played 10 September 2019. Albania score listed first, score column indicates score after each Roshi goal.

Honours

Club
Apolonia Fier
 Albanian Superliga Runner-up: 2007–08

Flamurtari
 Albanian Superliga Runner-up: 2010–11

Rijeka
 Croatian First Football League Runner-up: 2015–16

Individual
Albanian Superliga Talent of the Season: 2010–11

References

External links

 
 
 
 Odise Roshi – Euro 2016 profile at FSHF.org

1991 births
Sportspeople from Fier
Living people
Albanian footballers
Albania under-21 international footballers
Albania youth international footballers
Albania international footballers
Association football midfielders
Association football forwards
KF Apolonia Fier players
Flamurtari Vlorë players
1. FC Köln players
FSV Frankfurt players
HNK Rijeka players
FC Akhmat Grozny players
Diósgyőri VTK players
Boluspor footballers
Sakaryaspor footballers
Kategoria Superiore players
Bundesliga players
2. Bundesliga players
Croatian Football League players
Russian Premier League players
Nemzeti Bajnokság I players
TFF First League players
Albanian expatriate footballers
Albanian expatriate sportspeople in Germany
Albanian expatriate sportspeople in Croatia
Albanian expatriate sportspeople in Russia
Albanian expatriate sportspeople in Hungary
Albanian expatriate sportspeople in Turkey
Expatriate footballers in Germany
Expatriate footballers in Croatia
Expatriate footballers in Russia
Expatriate footballers in Hungary
Expatriate footballers in Turkey
UEFA Euro 2016 players